Seven Minutes may refer to:

Seven Minutes (1989 film) (Georg Elser – Einer aus Deutschland) a 1989 German film by Klaus Maria Brandauer (English version title).
The Seven Minutes, a 1969 novel by Irving Wallace
The Seven Minutes (film), a 1971 movie by Russ Meyer, based on the novel
"The Seven Minutes", a 1971 song by B.B. King Philips & Stone
"The Seven Minutes", a 1979 song by Hardware

See also
Seven More Minutes
Seven minutes in heaven teenagers' party game
Seven minutes in heaven (disambiguation)
Seven Minutes to Midnight (disambiguation)